The 1992 Benson and Hedges Open was a men's ATP men's tennis tournament held in Auckland, New Zealand and played on outdoor hard courts. It was part of the World Series of the 1992 ATP Tour. It was the 25th edition of the tournament and was held from 6 January through 13 January 1992. Unseeded Jaime Yzaga won the singles title.

Finals

Singles

 Jaime Yzaga defeated  MaliVai Washington 7–6(8–6), 6–4
 It was Yzaga's 1st title of the year and the 5th of his career.

Doubles

 Wayne Ferreira /  Jim Grabb defeated  Grant Connell /  Glenn Michibata 6–4, 6–3
 It was Ferreira's 1st title of the year and the 3rd of his career. It was Grabb's 1st title of the year and the 9th of his career.

References

External links
 
 ATP – tournament profile
 ITF – tournament edition details

Heineken Open
Heineken
ATP Auckland Open
January 1992 sports events in New Zealand